The River Cynon in South Wales is a main tributary of the Taff. The water emerging at Llygad Cynon has been traced back to the sink of the Nant Cadlan at Ogof Fawr.

The Nant Cadlan and its tributary the Ceunant Du rise on the slopes of Cefn Cadlan to the northeast of Penderyn flowing initially southeast and then south on the east side of the village to the point where the Cynon arises, adding to the flow emerging from the rising. The waters of the Nant y Bwllfa enter the Cynon as a left-bank tributary between Penderyn and Hirwaun. Downstream, the course of the river has been altered at the former Hirwaun Ironworks.  The combined flow of the Nant Hir and Nant Melyn enter the river to the north of Penywaun and that of the Nant y Gwyddel to the east of Penywaun. The Dare River enters as a right bank tributary at Aberdare and the Aman River at Aberaman. The final tributary of any size is the Nant Pennar which enters on the Cynon's left bank at Mountain Ash (Welsh: Aberpennar).

Related terms
Together with two neighbouring rivers, it gives its name to a local authority, with unitary status, Rhondda Cynon Taf.

The valley, broadly defined as the bulk of the drainage basin is detailed in Cynon Valley.

References

Brecon Beacons
Fforest Fawr
Rivers of Rhondda Cynon Taf
Rivers of the Brecon Beacons National Park